Seljalandsfoss is a waterfall in Iceland. Seljalandsfoss is located in the South Region in Iceland right by Route 1 and the road that leads to Þórsmörk Road 249. The waterfall drops  and is part of the Seljalands River that has its origin in the volcano glacier Eyjafjallajökull. Visitors can walk behind the falls into a small cave.

Controversy 
Plans to build an 8-metre high, 2000 square-metre information centre near the waterfall provoked controversy in Iceland in May 2017. Opponents of the plans argued that the building would spoil the view of the waterfall and interrupt the natural look of the area.

In popular culture 
Seljalandsfoss was a waypoint during the first leg of The Amazing Race 6.

Seljalandsfoss was featured in the movie CKY2K along with music from Björk.

A scene from the 1990 movie The Juniper Tree (film) has Björk's character walk behind the waterfall.

The official music video of "I'll Show You" by Justin Bieber features glacial lagoons and rivers in South Iceland, including Seljalandsfoss.

The first episode of season three of Star Trek: Discovery "That Hope Is You, Part 1" featured a brief scene at the waterfall.

See also

 Waterfalls of Iceland
 List of waterfalls

References

Waterfalls of Iceland